The Cat's Table is a novel by Canadian author Michael Ondaatje first published in 2011. It was a shortlisted nominee for the 2011 Scotiabank Giller Prize.

The novel is a coming of age story about an 11-year-old boy's journey on a large ship's three-week voyage. Ondaatje himself went on such a voyage in his childhood, from Sri Lanka to England.

Synopsis
The central character and narrator named Michael, an unaccompanied 11-year-old boy, boards an ocean liner, the Oronsay, in Colombo en route to England via the Suez canal and the Mediterranean. For meals on board Michael is seated at the "cat's table" (the one furthest from the Captain's table) with other boys Ramadhin and Cassius and other misfit characters. The book follows the adventures of Michael and these boys while they are aboard the Oronsay, and Michael's later perspective as an older man looking back on this boyhood voyage.

Characters
Seated at The Cat's Table:
 Michael ("Mynah"): the protagonist, 11 years old.
 Ramadhin: a quiet boy, 11 years old.
 Cassius: a rowdy daredevil boy, 12 years old.
 Max Mazappa (stage name Sunny Meadows): pianist with the ship's orchestra in his 30s.
 Miss Perinetta Lasqueti: a wan-looking spinster in her 30s with several unforeseen qualities.
 Mr. Nevil: a retired ship dismantler.
 Larry Daniels: a botanist conveying a "garden" of live plants to England.
 Mr. Gunesekera: a tailor, an apparent mute.

Elsewhere on the ship:
 Miss Emily de Saram: a distant cousin of Michael and his long-time confidante, 17 years old.
 "Aunt" Flavia Prins: a distant friend of Michael's family who is his ostensible shipboard guardian. She is in First Class and takes the responsibility to oversee Michael very lightly.
 Mr. Hastie: Michael's roommate, keeper of the ship's dog kennel and an ardent bridge player.
 Mr. Invernio: Mr. Hastie's assistant kennel keeper and fellow bridge player.
 Mr. Fonseka: a schoolteacher who introduces Michael to books.
 Sir Hector de Silva: a wealthy man suffering from a likely fatal illness, traveling to England for treatment with his family and several doctors.
 Sunil (stage name The Hyderabad Mind) a member of the Jankla Troupe of shipboard circus performers.
 Asuntha: a frail, nearly deaf young Sinhalese girl.
 Niemeyer: a prisoner in chains being conveyed to England for trial.
 Mr. Giggs: an English officer escorting Niemeyer to trial.
 Mr. Perera: an undercover Ceylonese police officer overseeing Niemeyer.
 The Baron C.: a thief who enlists Michael's aid.
 The Captain.

Not on the ship:
 Massoumeh ("Massi"): Ramadhin's sister, later Michael's wife.

Reception
Liesl Schillinger for The New York Times, while noting Ondaatje's appended disclaimer that The Cat's Table is a work of fiction, stated, "So convincing is Ondaatje’s evocation of his narrator’s experience that the reader could easily mistake it for the author’s own". Philip Hensher for The Telegraph was largely positive, writing, "Michael Ondaatje’s impressive new novel, containing dreams and fantasy between a ship’s flanks. It is, in the most etymological way, a wonderful novel: one full of wonders." Adam Mars-Jones was less impressed, writing in his review in The Observer, "Perhaps The Cat's Table aspires to a … doubleness of texture and meaning, the yarn of adventure story backed with the deeper colours of adult experience, but on the level of craftsmanship it doesn't measure up." Jess Row, writing for New York Magazine, described The Cat's Table as being unlike Ondaatje's earlier works, as it allows the reader to experience what's going on in the characters' heads, not strictly focusing on the setting of the world.

References

2011 Canadian novels
Novels by Michael Ondaatje
Jonathan Cape books
Canadian bildungsromans
Novels set on ships
Fictional ships
McClelland & Stewart books